James Richards (October 29, 1723 – May 17, 1810) was a member of the Connecticut House of Representatives from Norwalk in the sessions of October 1779, and October 1782. He served as a captain in the Connecticut Militia during the American Revolutionary War.

He was the son of Samuel Richards and Elizabeth Latham.

He began life as a clerk, becoming afterward a soldier and sailor. He was present, in arms, at the Battle of Norwalk, and the Invasion of Danbury.

Richards' wife Ruth Hanford, was a daughter of Samuel Hanford, a granddaughter of Eleazer Hanford, and a great-granddaughter of Rev. Thomas Hanford, of Norwalk. Ruth Hanford's mother was a daughter of Moses Comstock.

References 

1723 births
1810 deaths
Connecticut militiamen in the American Revolution
Members of the Connecticut House of Representatives
Politicians from Norwalk, Connecticut
Military personnel from Connecticut